Helmut Bennemann (16 March 1915 – 17 November 2007) was an Oberstleutnant of Nazi Germany's Luftwaffe in World War II. Bennemann claimed 93 aerial victories in over 400 combat missions. The majority of his victories were claimed over the Eastern Front. His commands included Geschwaderkommodore of the JG 53 fighter wing.

World War II
Helmut Bennemann held the position of Adjutant of I./Jagdgeschwader 52 (JG 52—52nd Fighter Wing) in June 1940. He claimed his first aerial victory on 26 August, when he shot down a Royal Air Force (RAF) Spitfire near Dover. On 15 September, Bennemann claimed three RAF Hurricane shot down to record his sixth through eighth victories.

Until 21 February, the entire I. Gruppe was based at an airfield at Katwijk in the Netherlands where it was tasked with patrolling the Dutch coast area and German Bight, the three Staffeln were then deployed at various airfields on the Dutch, German and Danish North Sea coast. On 27 April 1941, Bennemann was appointed Staffelkapitän (Squadron Leader) of 3. Staffel of JG 52. He replaced Oberleutnant Helmut Kühle who was transferred. By the time I./JG 52 was transferred to the Eastern Front in September 1941, Bennemann had claimed 12 victories.

Operation Barbarossa
On 14 June 1942, Bennemann was promoted to Gruppenkommandeur (group commander) of I. Gruppe of JG 52. He succeeded Hauptmann Karl-Heinz Leesmann was transferred. A Petlyakov Pe-2 bomber shot down by Bennemann on 23 August was I. Gruppes 600 aerial victory to date. His 62nd aerial victory claimed over a Mikoyan-Gurevich MiG-3 fighter on 2 November was the 800th aerial victory of I. Gruppe. By the End of 1942 his score stood at 72 victories.

On 10 May 1943, Benemann was severely wounded by the explosion of an incendiary bomb at Charkow-Woitschenko Airfield. During his convalescence, he was replaced by Hauptmann Johannes Wiese and Hauptmann Gerhard Barkhorn as commander of I. Gruppe. Command of the Gruppe officially passed to Wiese on 5 October.

Wing commander
Bennemann was appointed Geschwaderkommodore of Jagdgeschwader 53 (JG 53—53rd Fighter Wing) on 9 November 1943. He took over command from Oberst Günther Freiherr von Maltzahn who had been transferred on 4 October. Intermittently, the Geschwader had been led by both Major Friedrich-Karl Müller and Major Kurt Ubben. On 25 April 1944, he shot down a USAAF B-24 over Bologna to claim his 90th victory. However, his Bf 109G-6 (Werknummer 163 314—factory number) "Black < 3" was hit by defensive fire and Bennemann was again wounded, baling out successfully. In June 1944, Bennemann led the Geschwaderstab of JG 53 on a short return to the Eastern Front, to direct the supply missions for the city of Vilna. The unit departed the Soviet Union for Wunstorf near Hannover in Germany on 22 July. From August 1944, Bennemann led JG 53 on Reichsverteidigung missions, initially from bases in France, then from bases in Germany. He claimed his last three victories in October 1944 to bring his final score to 93. Among his 93 victories are at least 10 Il-2 Sturmoviks claimed over the Eastern Front.

In early 1945 he participated in the "Fighter Pilots Revolt", a minor insurrection among the high-ranking Luftwaffe pilots, whereas they confronted the Reich Marshal and chief of the Luftwaffe Hermann Göring with their demands on the conduct of the air war.

Summary of career

Aerial victory claims
According to US historian David T. Zabecki, Bennemann was credited with 93 aerial victories. Obermaier also list Bennemann with 93 aerial victories claimed in over 400 combat missions. This figure includes 77 claims on the Eastern Front and 16 over the Western Allies, including one four-engine bomber. Spick lists him with 92 aerial victories with 70 on the Eastern Front and 22 on the Western Front. Mathews and Foreman, authors of Luftwaffe Aces — Biographies and Victory Claims, researched the German Federal Archives and found records for 89 aerial victory claims, plus four further unconfirmed claims. This figure of confirmed claims includes 76 aerial victories on the Eastern Front and 14 on the Western Front, including one four-engined bomber.

Victory claims were logged to a map-reference (PQ = Planquadrat), for example "PQ 6083". These sectors were then subdivided into 36 smaller units to give a location area 3 × 4 km in size.

Awards
 Iron Cross (1939) 2nd and 1st class
 Honor Goblet of the Luftwaffe (5 October 1940)
 German Cross in Gold on 27 July 1942 as Hauptmann in the I./Jagdgeschwader 52
 Knight's Cross of the Iron Cross on 2 October 1942 as Hauptmann and Gruppenkommandeur of the I./Jagdgeschwader 52

Notes

References

Citations

Bibliography

 
 
 
 
 
 
 
 
 
 
 
 
 
 
 
 
 

1915 births
2007 deaths
People from the Province of Westphalia
Luftwaffe pilots
German World War II flying aces
People from Herne, North Rhine-Westphalia
Recipients of the Gold German Cross
Recipients of the Knight's Cross of the Iron Cross
Military personnel from North Rhine-Westphalia